XF3 may refer to:

Aviation 
Bell D-188A (also designated XF3L), proposed supersonic tiltjet fighter
Berliner-Joyce XF3J, biplane fighter
Grumman F3F (experimental designation XF3F-1), biplane fighter
Ishikawajima-Harima F3 (development designation XF3), turbofan jet engine
Vought XF3U, prototype biplane fighter
Wright XF3W Apache, racing aircraft

Other uses 
(49379) 1998 XF3, minor planet
The X Factor (British series 3), British TV series
Radio callsign for the Caribbean islands in Mexico - see Call signs in Mexico